CroisiEurope (Alsace Croisières until 1997) is an international river cruise company. It operates a fleet of river cruising vessels along the rivers of Europe, Russia, Mekong, Burma (Myanmar), Africa, South America and the United States.

The company also offers cruises on seas such as the Mediterranean Sea, the Baltic Sea, and the Black Sea.

CroisiEurope has offices and sales offices in Strasbourg, Lyon, Paris, Nice, Lausanne and the United States.

History 
Gérard Schmitter  founded the company in 1976. In 1982, he chartered his first boat, the Alsace, and 1984 saw his first cabin boats.

In 1986, the first "Prestige" category boat, the Kellerman, came into being.  In 1990 the company became the owner of its own fleet. In 1991 a new office in Paris was opened, and 1993 saw the launch of the first Danube cruises, followed in 1995 and 1997 by the first Rhône and Saône cruises. Initially called Alsace Croisières, the company became CroisiEurope in keeping with its expansion outside France.

In 1998 it launched its first cruises on the Seine. In 1999, the founder, Gérard Schmitter, handed the reins of the company over to his four children - Patrick, Philippe, Christian and Anne-Marie.

In 2000, the North/South European axis was developed; in 2001 the company opened an office in Lyon. 2002 saw the launch of the first cruises on the Douro in Portugal. The Brussels branch was opened in 2002, followed by one in Nice in 2003, the same year as the launch of the MS Fernao da Magalhaes in Porto, and the MS Leonardo da Vinci in Venice. In 2004, CroisiEurope embarked on the conquest of the Danube.

The company celebrated its 30th birthday in 2006, and in 2007 it became an official agent for CroisiMer. A new branch opened in Lausanne in 2008. In 2009, the MS Vivaldi was launched on the Danube. In 2010, the company created the CroisiYacht  brand and launched cruises on the Volga.

In 2011, CroisiEurope celebrated its 35th anniversary and offered new cruises on the Gironde and the Garonne departing from Bordeaux. 2012 will see the construction of a new boat that will sail on the Rhine.

In July and August 2012, CroisiEurope will launch new cruises in the Cyclades and on the Mekong, from August 2012.

In 2013, CroisiEurope introduced Jeanine to the Canals of France. Completely rebuilt from the bottom up, the ship has the capacity for 24 guests and features staterooms similar to a larger ship. Jeanine has been so successful that another three sister-ships are currently under construction.

After being a leader in the European river cruising market for decades, CroisiEurope began offering its services to the North American market in 2013. The company hired a New York-based public relations firm and in 2014 hired a director of sales for marketing in the United States.

In March 2014, CroisiEurope acquired the river cruise company Compagnie Fluviale du Mékong, or CFM, which operates on the Mekong River in Vietnam and Cambodia. As part of the acquisitions, CroisiEurope gained four new colonial-style ships. The vessels offer cruising along the Mekong River, between Cambodia and Vietnam, from August to April.

Also in March 2014, CroisiEurope christened the MS Lafayette, which sails along the Rhine in Strasbourg, France. The ship was named after the French general whose support played a substantial role in securing American independence.  It features more spacious cabins and offers exclusive excursions to Mainau Island, Mainz, the Black Forest and the Titisee, Strasbourg and Aix-la-Chapelle or Aachen. Two hotel barges, MS Anne-Marie and MS Madeleine, were also christened.

The third generation arrives in 2015 : Déborah, Lucas, Kim and soon Jordan, Christian's son.

That same year the company launched 3 brand new ships, built in Saint-Nazaire by Neopolia. Those ships have 5 anchors and among them, there are the first waterwheels of the company, the "MS Loire Princesse" Tech that allows it to cruise on the low waters of the Loire.

In 2016, another waterwheel was christened by CroisiEurope, the "MS Elbe Princesse".

For 2017, loads of new ships are planned, like the "RV Princesse Apsara" that will sail on the Mekong.

Fleet 
CroisiEurope currently has a fleet of 43 Prestige category boats that cruise all of Europe's rivers. Accommodation capacity varies from 100 to 180 passengers depending on the ship's design.

The CroisiEurope fleet is partially renovated each year, being mostly made up of recently built vessels that are less than five years old.

French is the primary language spoken on the ships, although most staff members also speak English and other European languages. Ship announcements are made in French and in English.

The four-star vessels provide French cuisine food cooked by French chefs and accompanied with French and German wines.

Like most Europe river lines, CroisiEurope provides wine, beer and soft drinks with lunch and dinner year-round and offers unlimited drinks—including house spirits—during the high season from April to October.

RHINE AND DANUBE

SEINE AND PARIS

RHONE AND SAONE

GARONNA AND DORDOGNE

LOIRE

DOURO

GUADALQUIVIR AND GUADIANA

Po

CANALS OF FRANCE

COASTAL CRUISES

MEKONG

ELBE

Destinations 
In France, CroisiEurope sails on the Seine, the Rhône, the Saône, the Gironde, the Meuse, and the Rhine; in Italy, on the Po; in Spain, on the Guadalquivir; in Portugal, on the Guadiana and the Douro; in Germany, Belgium, and the Netherlands, on the Rhine; in Germany, Austria, Hungary, Serbia, and Romania, on the Danube; and in Germany, on the Havel and the Oder.

CroisiEurope also has a coastal ship, the MS Belle de l'Adriatique, which operates in March, April, May, June, September, and October in the Dalmatian Islands in Croatia, in July and August in the Cyclades in Greece, and from November to February in the Canary Islands.

Furthermore, three other cruise ships are chartered by the company on the Volga between Moscow and Saint Petersburg (and return), and another on the Mekong, from Saigon (Ho Chi Minh City) to Angkor and return.

Many of the stops are classified as World Heritage Sites.

References

External links 

  Croisieurope Website

River cruise companies
Cruise lines
Transport in Strasbourg
Companies based in Strasbourg